The 1999 Toray Pan Pacific Open singles was the singles event of the twenty-fourth edition of the Toray Pan Pacific Open Tennis Tournament, the first WTA Tier I tournament of the year. Lindsay Davenport was the defending champion but lost in the quarterfinals to Amanda Coetzer.

Martina Hingis won in the final 6–2, 6–1 against Coetzer.

Seeds
The top four seeds received a bye to the second round.

Draw

Final

Top half

Bottom half

Qualifying

Seeds

Qualifiers

Qualifying draw

First qualifier

Second qualifier

Third qualifier

Fourth qualifier

External links
 1999 Toray Pan Pacific Open Draw

Pan Pacific Open
Toray Pan Pacific Open - Singles
1999 Toray Pan Pacific Open